Austria competed at the 1992 Summer Paralympics in Barcelona, Spain. 36 competitors from Austria won 22 medals including 5 gold, 4 silver and 13 bronze and finished 22nd in the medal table.

See also 
 Austria at the Paralympics
 Austria at the 1992 Summer Olympics

References 

Austria at the Paralympics
1992 in Austrian sport
Nations at the 1992 Summer Paralympics